was a Japanese businessman, 2nd Governor of the Bank of Japan (BOJ), and Governor of Tokyo.

Biography
Tomita was born in Sendai Domain (modern Miyagi Prefecture),  as the fourth son of a samurai retainer to the Date clan. In 1856, he was sent by the domain to Edo, to study western artillery science, and soon after his return, was sent back to Edo again to study naval science under Katsu Kaishū. In 1867, he was chosen to accompany Katsu Kaishū’s son to the United States for studies. He studied economics at the Whitney Business College in Newark, New Jersey, under William C Whitney (who was subsequently hired by Mori Arinori as a foreign advisor to teach the Double-entry bookkeeping system in Japan).

With the Boshin War, and the overthrow of the Tokugawa Shogunate, Tomita returned briefly to Japan, but was urged back to the United States by Katsu Kaishū. His position was recognized by the new Meiji government was thus able to help organize the visit of the Iwakura Mission to the United States in 1872. Ito Hirobumi and Okubo Toshimichi confirmed his position as the first Japanese Vice-Consul to New York during the course of the Iwakura Mission. He finally returned to Japan in 1874, and soon became a member of the Meirokusha. Through the introduction of Fukuzawa Yukichi, he married the daughter of Sugiyama Gen, and drew up the first recorded formal marriage contract in Japan. Afterwards, he was appointed Japanese consul-general to Shanghai. Subsequently, Tomita served as Secretary to the Japanese legation in London.

On Tomita’s return to Japan in 1881, he was recruited by the Ministry of Finance for his wide-ranging knowledge of world economics, and was appointed the first Vice-Governor of the new Bank of Japan in 1882. After the sudden death of Yoshihara Shigetoshi, the 1st Governor of the Bank of Japan in 1887, Tomita was promoted on February 21, 1888, to take his position. During his tenure, he attempted to establish a central discount rate and stabilize foreign exchange, which he saw as core roles of a central bank. However, in these actions he was opposed by the Yokohama Specie Bank and by Finance Minister Matsukata Masayoshi. Resisting orders by Matsukata to change BOJ policies, he was relieved of his position on September 3, 1889, after 19 months as head of the bank.

The following year, Tomita was appointed to a seat in the House of Peers of the Diet of Japan, and from July 21, 1891, to October 26, 1893, was Governor of Tokyo. During his tenure, the three Tama Districts were transferred from Kanagawa Prefecture to Tokyo, thus greatly expanding its hinterland.1891年7月21日 - 1893年10月26日

In 1893, he retired from politics and entered the business world, founding the Kangyo Bank (one of the predecessors of modern Mizuho Corporate Bank), the Yokohama Fire Insurance Company, later known as Yokohama Fire, Marine, Transit & Fidelity Insurance, and Fujibo Holdings. He was also a director on the board of the Nippon Railway. Tomita also founded the Kyoritsu Women's University.

Notes

References
 Hardacre, Helen. New directions in the study of Meiji Japan. Brill. 
 Reischauer, Haru Matsukata. Samurai and Silk: Japanese and American Heritage (1986) Harvard University Press 
 Singer, Isidore. (1910). International Insurance Encyclopedia. New York: American Encyclopedic Library Assoc.  OCLC 9233410

1835 births
1916 deaths
Governors of the Bank of Japan
Governors of Tokyo
Japanese bankers
Japanese diplomats
Japanese expatriates in the United States
Members of the House of Peers (Japan)
People from Miyagi Prefecture
Politicians from Tokyo
Consuls General of Japan in Shanghai